Malacomeles, or false serviceberry, is a genus of flowering plants in the Rosaceae. It is most closely related to Amelanchier, Peraphyllum, Crataegus, and Mespilus.

Species
Malacomeles denticulata
Malacomeles nervosa
Malacomeles paniculata

References

Maleae
Rosaceae genera
Taxa named by Joseph Decaisne